A. Wilson Hall was a New Zealand rugby league footballer who played in the 1920s and 1930s who represented New Zealand and later played at club level in England for Castleford.

Playing career
From the Ngaruawahia club, Wilson Hall represented South Auckland in 1922. He was a half for South Auckland and the North Island in 1925.

In 1923 he moved to Auckland and played for the Athletic club. He represented Auckland in a match against South Auckland for the Northern Union Challenge Cup which was drawn 20-20. Later in the same season he played against Auckland for the Auckland Province. The match was played at Carlaw Park and saw his side go down 18–44 with him scoring a try for the 'visiting team'.

In 1926 he moved to Christchurch. Wilson Hall then represented the Hornby club, Canterbury and the South Island.

He was selected for New Zealand's tour of Great Britain in 1926. He played in two test matches against Great Britain and one against Wales.

In 1927 the international transfer ban for players was lifted and many New Zealanders who had toured were signed by English clubs. Wilson Hall received interested from Halifax in June, before signing with the Swinton club.

Wilson Hall then joined Castleford, and played in Castleford's victory in the Yorkshire County League during the 1932–33 season.

Hall was granted a free transfer by Castleford in September 1935 in recognition of his services.

References

External links
Search for "Wilson Hall" at britishnewspaperarchive.co.uk

Canterbury rugby league team players
Castleford Tigers players
Dewsbury Rams players
Maritime Football Club players
Hornby Panthers players
Hull F.C. players
New Zealand Māori rugby league players
New Zealand national rugby league team players
New Zealand rugby league players
Ngaruawahia Panthers players
North Island rugby league team players
Place of birth missing
Place of death missing
Rugby league halfbacks
South Island rugby league team players
Waikato rugby league team players
Year of birth missing
Year of death missing